Eremitu is a commune in Mureș County, Transylvania, Romania, composed of five villages:
Călugăreni / Mikháza
Câmpu Cetății / Vármező
Dămieni / Deményháza
Eremitu/Nyárádremete 
Mătrici / Nyárádköszvényes

Demographics
The commune has a Hungarian majority: according to the 2011 census, it had a population of 3,893 of which 89% were Hungarian.

Natives
Ferenc Nyulas (1758–1808), physician

See also 
 List of Hungarian exonyms (Mureș County)

References

Communes in Mureș County
Localities in Transylvania